The Exorcism of the Syrophoenician woman's daughter is one of the miracles of Jesus in the Gospels and is recounted in the Gospel of Mark in Chapter 7 and in the Gospel of Matthew in Chapter 15. In Matthew, the story is recounted as the healing of a Caananite woman's daughter. According to both accounts, Jesus exorcised the woman's daughter whilst travelling in the region of Tyre and Sidon, on account of the faith shown by the woman.

Passage
The relevant passage in Matthew 15:22-28 reads as follows:

A Canaanite woman from that region came to Jesus, crying out, "Lord, Son of David, have mercy on me! My daughter is demon-possessed and suffering terribly."

Jesus did not answer a word. So his disciples came to him and urged him, "Send her away, for she keeps crying out after us."

He answered, "I was sent only to the lost sheep of Israel".

The woman came and knelt before him. "Lord, help me!" she said.

He replied, "It is not right to take the children's bread and toss it to the dogs".

"Yes Lord," she said. "But even the dogs eat the crumbs that fall from their master's table."

Then Jesus said to her:

"Woman, you have great faith! Your daughter is healed."

And her daughter was healed from that very hour.

Many English translations of the Gospels state that Jesus was in the region of Tyre and Sidon and had withdrawn from Galilee where he had entered in discussion with the Pharisees over their interpretation of the Jewish law. The Geneva Bible and the King James Version suggest that the visit was to the coast (i.e. the Mediterranean Sea), but the Cambridge Bible for Schools and Colleges argues that Jesus went to "the neighbourhood, [or] district, not the sea-shore, as might be thought".

This episode is, according to Graham H. Twelftree, an example of how Jesus emphasizes the value of faith, as also shown in the Healing the Centurion's servant episode.

Syrophoenician woman

The woman described in the miracle, the Syrophoenician woman (Συροφοινίκισσα, Syrophoinikissa) is also called a "Canaanite" (Χαναναία, Chananaia) and is an unidentified New Testament woman from the region of Tyre and Sidon. "The woman is ... described as Syrophoenician by race. It is unclear whether Mark seeks to distinguish between a Phoenician from Syria and one from northern Africa or between someone living in the coastal area of Syria and someone living in the central part." Her other notable characteristic is her non-Jewish status: the Gospel of Mark adds that she is a Gentile (Ελληνις, Hellēnis, literally Greek).

The third century pseudo-Clementine homily refers to her name as Justa and her daughter's name as Berenice.

Commentary
Thomas Aquinas comments on this passage in his homily on the sinful soul saying,
Five things are noted of this woman of Canaan which availed for the liberation of this demoniac. (1) Humility: “ Yet the dogs eat.” (2) Her patience, since she patiently endured the seeming reproaches of Our Lord. (3) Her prayer, “ Have mercy on me, O Lord.” (4) Her perseverance : she did not cease asking till she obtained what she desired. (5) Her faith: “O woman, great is thy faith.” If we had had these five qualities we should be delivered from every devil, that is, from all sin; which may Christ grant us to be. Amen.

See also
 Life of Jesus in the New Testament
 Ministry of Jesus
 Miracles of Jesus
 Parables of Jesus
 Perfection of Christ
 1st century in Lebanon
 Asian feminist theology

References

Further reading

 Burkill, T. A. "The Historical Development of the Story of the Syrophoenician Woman (Mark vii: 24-31).", Novum Testamentum 9 (1967): 161–177.
 Downing, F. Gerald. "The Woman from Syrophoenicia, and her Doggedness: Mark 7:24-31 (Matthew 15:21-28)." Women in the Biblical Tradition. Ed. George J. Brooke. Lewiston: The Edwin Mellen Press, 1992. 129–149.
 Schäfler, Markus, "The Syrophoenician Woman (Mk 7:24-31)"
 Alt, C., The Dynamic of Humility and Wisdom: The Syrophoenician Woman and Jesus in Mark 7:24-31a, Lumen et Vita, Vol. 2, 2012
 Alonso, P. 2011. The woman who changed Jesus. Crossing Boundaries in Mk 7,24-30. Biblical tools and studies, 11 . Peeters Publishers.

External links

Exorcisms of Jesus
Women in the New Testament
Gospel of Matthew
Gospel of Mark
Tyre, Lebanon
History of Sidon
Phoenicians in the New Testament